Bajna is a town and a nagar panchayat in Mathura district  in the state of Uttar Pradesh, India.

Geography
Bajna has an average elevation of 183 metres (600 feet). Bajna Nagar Panchayat has total administration over 1,343 houses to which it supplies basic amenities like water and sewerage. It is also authorized to build roads within Nagar Panchayat limits and impose taxes on properties coming under its jurisdiction.

Demographics
As of the 2001 Census of India, Bajna had a population of 7031. Males constitute 54% of the population and females 46%. Bajna has an average literacy rate of 58%, lower than the national average of 59.5%; with 65% of the males and 35% of females literate. 18% of the population is under 6 years of age.

Education 
There are two government run inter colleges, the Brijhitkari Inter College, and the Bajna (morki) Inter College. Brijhitkari Inter College is within the town whilst Bajna Inter College is on the outskirts, nearly 2 km away from main town. There are several private schools providing English medium education, notable ones include CLA Public School and Arcadian Public School.

Nearby cities
 Aligarh
 Khair
 Mathura
 Noida

Nearby villages 
Jaralia, Parsouli, Lalpur, Saddikpur, Nayabas, Chandpur, Aandhre ki Ghari, Noserpur, Managhari, Aajnoth, Bhoot Garhi, Chinta Garhi, Edal Garhi, Hamadpur, Badoth, Inayatpur, Manpur, Chindoli, Bhartiyaka, Jatpura, Mittholi, Mudiliya, Khanpur, Katailiya, Kaulahar.

References

Cities and towns in Mathura district